Alexei Nikolaievich Skorobogatov is a British-Russian mathematician and Professor in Pure Mathematics at Imperial College London specialising in algebraic geometry. His work has focused on rational points, the Hasse principle, the Manin obstruction, exponential sums, and error-correcting codes.

Education
He completed his dissertation under the supervision of Yuri Manin, for which he was awarded a Ph.D. degree.

Awards
In 2001 he was awarded a Whitehead Prize by the London Mathematical Society.

He was elected as a Fellow of the American Mathematical Society in the 2020 Class, for "contributions to the Diophantine geometry of surfaces and higher dimensional varieties".

Books

References

External links 
Alexei Skorobogatov's professional webpage
Alexei Skorobogatov's personal webpage

1961 births
Living people
20th-century Russian mathematicians
21st-century Russian mathematicians
Academics of Imperial College London
Whitehead Prize winners
Fellows of the American Mathematical Society
Moscow State University alumni